Bálint Galántai (born 14 February 1932) is a Hungarian wrestler. He competed in the men's freestyle featherweight at the 1956 Summer Olympics.

References

1932 births
Living people
Hungarian male sport wrestlers
Olympic wrestlers of Hungary
Wrestlers at the 1956 Summer Olympics
People from Zakarpattia Oblast